Events from the year 1921 in Denmark.

Incumbents
 Monarch – Christian X
 Prime minister – Niels Neergaard

Events

 May  The departure of the 5yh Thule Expedition.

Sports
 30 March  Lyngby Boldklub is founded.
 21 August  Gentofte-Vangede Idrætsforening is founded.

Cycling
  	30 July - 8 August  The 1921 UCI Track Cycling World Championships are held in Copenhagen.
 Henry Brask Andersen wins gold, Erik Kjeldsen wins silver and Johan Normann wins bronze in men's sprint at the Amateur event.
 4 August  The 1921 UCI Road World Championships are held in Copenhagen
 Willum Nielsen wins silver in Men's amateur road race.

Football
 AB wins its second Danish football championship by defeating Aarhus Gymnastikforening 30 in the final of the 1920–21 Danish National Football Tournament.

Births
 14 March – Lis Hartel, equestrian athlete (died 2009)
 16 March – Jens Bjerre, Danish author, filmmaker and explorer (died 2020)
 1 September – Simon Spies, businessman, billionaire (died 1984)
 21 November – Margrethe Schanne, ballerina (died 2014)

Deaths
 12 February – Troels Frederik Lund, historian (born 1840)
 18 May – Martin Nyrop, architect (born 1849)
 8 September – Ingeborg Raunkiær, author (born 1863)
 8 October
 Henning Frederik Feilberg, pastor, author and folklorist (born 1831)
 Emma Eleonore Meyer, painter (born 1859)

References

 
Denmark
Years of the 20th century in Denmark
1920s in Denmark
Denmark